Mohamed Ouaadi (born 1 January 1969 in Tiznit, Morocco) is a retired French long-distance runner who specialized in the marathon.

Achievements

Personal bests
5000 metres - 13:44.8 minutes (1998)
10,000 metres - 28:33.59  minutes (2002)
Half marathon - 1:02:29 hours (1998)
Marathon - 2:07:55 hours (1999)

External links
 
 

1969 births
Living people
French male long-distance runners
French male marathon runners
Athletes (track and field) at the 2000 Summer Olympics
Olympic athletes of France
French people of Shilha descent
Paris Marathon male winners
People from Tiznit